Frank Kvinge (born 21 January 1968 in Sandnes, Norway) is a Norwegian jazz musician (guitar) residing in Drøbak near Oslo, known from several album releases.

Career 
After finishing high school in Sandnes he studied guitar at the Guitar Institute of Technology in Los Angeles 1987, before moving to Chicago in 1989. In the period 1989–2001 he worked there as professional guitarist on the jazz and blues scenes, sometimes with his own band. Since 2002 he has lived in Norway, working with the late Jan Erik Kongshaug from 2013 to 2019.

Discography

Solo albums 
Solo guitar
2007: Grieg, solo guitar (Ponca Jazz Records)
2010: Arctic skyway (Losen Records)

Band leader
2001: Brasilian style (Self Release/Losen Records)
2006: Small stories (Ponca Jazz Records), with Erlend Skomsvoll (piano), Kenneth Ekornes (drums), Jan Erik Kongshaug (bass) & Sven Nyhus (violin)
2012: Gaucho Batuta (Self Release/Losen Records)

Collaborations 
With Synnøve Rognlien
2012: Wild Birds (Losen Records)

References

External links 

Norwegian jazz guitarists
Norwegian jazz composers
Male jazz composers
Losen Records artists
Musicians from Sandnes
People from Frogn
1968 births
Living people